State Road 951 (SR 951), locally known as Collier Boulevard, is a  north–south divided highway that extends from the south end of the Judge S.S. Jolley Bridge in Marco Island to the Tamiami Trail (U.S. Route 41 (US 41)/SR 90) near Naples Manor, along with a short  piece between SR 84 and Interstate 75 (I-75). Portions of the former state highway are now part of County Road 951 (CR 951).

Route description
State Road 951 begins at the south end of the S.S. Jolley Bridge in Marco Island, crossing Big Marco Pass, passing through marshland and woodland as it leaves Marco Island and heads towards the mainland, crossing an intersection with CR 952 (Capri Boulevard).  The next intersection, Mainsail Drive, provides access to Marco Island Airport.  Further north on the mainland, the road passes by some newer housing and country club developments as it intersects with Tamiami Trail, the northern terminus of the southern segment.

The road resumes near Golden Gate at SR 84's eastern terminus on Florida's Gulf Coast, and has an interchange with I-75 at the west end of Alligator Alley, with the northern end of the interchange being the northern terminus.

History

Most of the current portion of State Road 951 south of U.S. Route 41 came into existence around 1955 during development of the Isles of Capri.  It was built upon the abandoned rail bed of the Atlantic Coast Line Railroad's Fort Myers to Marco Island branch, which existed from 1927 to 1944.

Prior to 1976, State Road 951 extended along a much longer route than it does today.  It began at the Isles of Capri (along the current CR 952).  When the Jolley Bridge was built to Marco Island in 1969, the route across it was designated SR 951B.  At State Road 84 (the original Alligator Alley and current Davis Boulevard), SR 951's designation then zig-zagged into North Naples along what is today Radio Road, Airport-Pulling Road, Golden Gate Parkway and Goodlette-Frank Road, ultimately terminating at the intersection of Goodlette-Frank Road and then-SR 896 (Pine Ridge Road).  The current Collier Boulevard north of SR 84 was designated State Road 858 at the time.

Many state roads in Collier County were re-designated on January 5, 1976. SR 951 was then designated as a secondary state road from Marco Island (at State Road 92) northward along the former SR 858 to an intersection with the then-State Road 846 (now County Road 846), which provides access to the Big Cypress Swamp town of Immokalee and the Corkscrew Swamp Sanctuary.  The state road designation of the northernmost  of SR 951 were phased out in the 1980s as they were relinquished to county control.  They were also removed from other roads in the Big Cypress Swamp.

State Road 951 formerly extended  to the south, terminating at County Road 92 (San Marco Road) in Marco Island.  This section was turned over to the city of Marco Island on November 29, 2004.

Major intersections

References

External links

SR 951 @ AARoads.com

951
951
951